Lime Garden are a British indie rock band from Brighton.

History
Meeting originally in Guildford, the band changed it's name from LIME in Brighton. They are signed to So Young Records, a partner label of Communion Records. Self described as ‘wonk pop’, the band blend a number of genres including disco, pop and surf.

Named as one of NME’s top 100 artists for 2022, the band has had mainstream coverage in the national press including The Independent, Dork, and Clash Magazine. They have played UK festivals including Latitude, Reading and Leeds Festival, Green Man Festival and Standon Calling and have toured with other artists including IDLES, Sunflower Bean and Yard Act.

Members
Chloe Howard – vocals, guitar
Annabel Whittle – drums
Leila Deeley – guitar
Tippi Morgan – bass

Discography

Singles

References

English indie rock groups
Musical groups established in 2017
Musical quartets
Musical groups from Brighton and Hove